This is a list of the number-one hit singles in 1971 in Denmark. The charts were produced by the IFPI Danmark and were published in the newspaper Ekstra Bladet.

Notes

References 

1971 in Denmark
Denmark
Lists of number-one songs in Denmark